Hui Zou is currently a Professor of Statistics at the University of Minnesota.

Selected publications

Honors and awards
 Fellow of the American Statistical Association, 2019
 Highly Cited Researcher in Mathematics, 2014, 2015, 2016, 2017, 2018
 Fellow, Institute of Mathematical Statistics, 2015.
 Institute of Mathematical Statistics Tweedie New Researcher Award, 2011
 National Science Foundation CAREER Award, 2009
 New Hot Paper in Mathematics, 2008 
 Fast Breaking Paper in Mathematics, 2006

References

External links

Living people
American people of Chinese descent
American statisticians
American computer scientists
Chinese statisticians
Fellows of the American Statistical Association
Chinese computer scientists
University of Science and Technology of China alumni
Stanford University alumni
University of Minnesota faculty
Year of birth missing (living people)